Kapya is a Plateau language spoken in Kapya village, Takum LGA, Taraba State, eastern Nigeria.

References

Yukubenic languages
 Languages of Nigeria